Zvyagintsevo is a rural locality in Klyukvinsky Selsoviet Rural Settlement, Kursky District, Kursk Oblast, Russia. Population:

Geography 
The village is located on the Seym River (a left tributary of the Desna), 100 km from the Russia–Ukraine border, 9 km east of the district center – the town Kursk, 1.5 km from the selsoviet center – Dolgoye.

 Climate
Zvyagintsevo has a warm-summer humid continental climate (Dfb in the Köppen climate classification).

Transport 
Zvyagintsevo is located 2.5 km from the federal route  (Kursk – Voronezh –  "Kaspy" Highway; a part of the European route ), on the road of intermunicipal significance  (R-298 – Klyukva – Yakunino), 3.5 km from the nearest railway station Konaryovo (railway line Klyukva — Belgorod).

The rural locality is situated 9 km from Kursk Vostochny Airport, 117 km from Belgorod International Airport and 197 km from Voronezh Peter the Great Airport.

References

Notes

Sources

Rural localities in Kursky District, Kursk Oblast